Mary Ellen Johnston Bock is a retired American statistician, now a professor emeritus at Purdue University
after becoming the first female full professor of statistics and the first female chair of the department there.
She was president of the American Statistical Association in 2007.

Education and career
As an undergraduate at the University of Illinois at Urbana–Champaign, Bock earned a bachelor's degree in the German language in 1967. She switched to mathematics for her graduate studies at the same university, completing her PhD in 1974 under the supervision of Robert B. Ash with a dissertation on Certain Minimax Estimators of the Mean of a Multivariate Normal Distribution.

As chair of statistics at Purdue from 1995 to 2010, Bock led the department through a period of growth, and took a multidisciplinary approach to the subject that included computational statistics as well as application areas including biostatistics, statistical finance, and environmental statistics.

Awards and honors
Bock is a fellow of the American Statistical Association, of the American Association for the Advancement of Science, and of the Institute of Mathematical Statistics. She won the Founders Award of the American Statistical Association in 2013.

References

Year of birth missing (living people)
Living people
American statisticians
Women statisticians
University of Illinois Urbana-Champaign alumni
Purdue University faculty
Fellows of the American Statistical Association
Fellows of the American Association for the Advancement of Science
Fellows of the Institute of Mathematical Statistics